Cyclazodone is a centrally acting stimulant drug developed by American Cyanamid Company in the 1960s. The drug is related to other drugs such as pemoline and thozalinone. It displayed a favorable therapeutic index and margin of safety in comparison to Pemoline and other N-lower-alkyl-substituted Pemoline derivatives. The patents concluded that Cyclazodone possessed properties efficacious in reducing fatigue and as a potential anorectic. Structural congeners of Pemoline have been described as "excitants with unique properties distinguishing them from the sympathomimetic amines" whilst displaying less stimulatory activity and toxicity compared to amphetamine.

It is included under the World Anti-Doping Agency prohibited list.

Safety
Cyclazodone has not been evaluated by the United States Food and Drug Administration for use in humans as a nootropic, anorectic, or stimulant and thus safety information on Cyclazodone is lacking.  However, in studies relating to the therapeutic uses of Cyclazodone, it was noted that Cyclazodone exhibited less cardiotoxic and hepatotoxic effects than D-Amphetamine in studies on mice.

See also
 List of aminorex analogues

References

Stimulants
Aminorexes
Norepinephrine-dopamine releasing agents
Oxazolones